Brian Connaughton (born 1942/43 in Dublin, Ireland) is an Irish cyclist. He won the Rás Tailteann in 1969.

Early life
Connaughton is a native of County Meath and was a member of the Garda Síochána (Irish police).

Career
Connaughton began cycling competitively in 1962 and first competed in the Rás Tailteann in 1966. He won it in 1969 with five minutes to spare.

He also won the 1971 Tour of Ulster. In 1981, he raced his last Rás, earning his only stage win in that year.

Later life
In 1984 he opened the Cycleways shop with Philip Cassidy, another Rás winner. In 1993, they founded Base Active Distribution Ltd.

Connaughton later managed the Meath Lee Strand Team.

References

Irish male cyclists
Rás Tailteann winners
Garda Síochána officers
Sportspeople from County Meath
Year of birth uncertain